The Isle of Ladies is an anonymous fifteenth-century dream vision poem about an island governed by women which is invaded by men, after which there ensues a series of courtly romantic exploits. It is thought to draw on Chaucerian conventions, and some believe it to be written on the occasion of an aristocratic betrothal. Others argue that it is a "mock courtly romance,"  and a recent article examines feminine protest within the poem. It survives in only two manuscripts (Longleat House MS 256 and British Library MS Additional 10303), and extends to 2235 lines.

References

External links 
 complete annotated text of The Isle of Ladies
 The isle of ladies a free translation and retelling in modern English of the story found in Longleat House MS 256.

Utopian fiction
Feminist fiction
Middle English poems
15th-century poems